Gonzalo Rodolfo Winter Etcheberry is a Chilean lawyer and politician and member of the Social Convergence (CS) party. Since March 2018, he has been a deputy of the Republic representing the 10th district of the Santiago Metropolitan Region.

Early life and education
He was born in Santiago de Chile, on January 6, 1987. He is Son of Jaime Winter Garcés and María Elena Etcheberry Court, who was Superintendent of Isapres during the government of President Eduardo Frei Ruiz-Tagle.

He studied at the Verbo Divino School in Santiago, from which he graduated in 2005. In 2006, he began to study law at the Faculty of that branch of the University of Chile. He was sworn in as a lawyer on 9 October  2020.

Political career
In 2008, he actively participated in the Coordinating Assembly of Secondary Students (ACES). He was part of the foundations of Creando Izquierda, a group that contributed to the triumph of Gabriel Boric in FECH 2012.

In 2013, he was director of the Study Center of the Student Federation of the University of Chile (FECh), a group in charge of generating knowledge associated with the social movement for education. Later he served as a legislative advisor, during the period 2014 to 2018.

In 2016, he was part of the national leadership of the Autonomist Movement (MA).

In 2017 he was nominated by his community to represent it in the Broad Front (FA) pact, as a candidate for deputy, for the new district No. 10, being elected for the period 2018-2022, where he got 5,238 votes and the Broad Front took the 34.91% of the votes, representing 152,390 people, together with the deputy Giorgio Jackson and the former Democratic Revolution, Natalia Castillo.

On March 11, 2018, he became a deputy as an independent. He integrates the permanent commissions of Education; Housing and Urban Development and National Assets; Internal Regime and Administration, and participates in the investigative commissions on Financial Operations between Bancard Inversiones Ltda. and companies in tax havens, also on Acts of public organizations in relation to the situation of Universidad del Pacífico where he chaired the commission.

References

External links
 

1987 births
University of Chile alumni
21st-century Chilean politicians
Members of the Autonomist Movement
Social Convergence politicians
Living people
Members of the Chamber of Deputies of Chile